Humboldtiana nuevoleonis is a species of American air-breathing land snail, a terrestrial pulmonate gastropod mollusk in the family Humboldtianidae.

Anatomy

Snails in this species create and use love darts as part of their mating behavior.

References

 Mentioned at 

Humboldtianidae
Gastropods described in 1927